"Three Gays of the Condo" is the seventeenth episode of the fourteenth season of the American animated television series The Simpsons. It originally aired on the Fox network in the United States on April 13, 2003. The episode was written by Matt Warburton and directed by Mark Kirkland. The title is a pun on the 1975 film Three Days of the Condor. In the episode Homer finds out that while dating, Marge did not enjoy going to Moe's Tavern while Homer got drunk. Homer notices two days later that Marge is pregnant with Bart, so he thinks that is why she stayed with him. Upset, Homer moves in with two gay men, Grady and Julio.

"Three Gays of the Condo" was The Simpsons''' second episode to revolve entirely on homosexuality, after "Homer's Phobia" in 1997, and just like the predecessor, the episode received largely positive reviews from both the critics and the LGBT community, praised for its smart comedy. The episode won the Primetime Emmy Award for Outstanding Animated Program, just as "Homer's Phobia" did in 1997.

Plot
The family is creating an enormous jigsaw puzzle. After they realize a jigsaw piece is missing, the family look for it. Homer looks through Marge's memory box and sees a poster of Moe's Tavern's opening (advertised as Meaux's Tavern) with Marge's writing on it. It says that Homer made the opening the worst day of her life because due to him becoming drunk and ditching her to play Asteroids on an arcade machine with his friends, after which he was sent to the hospital with alcohol poisoning. This leaves Homer concerned about why Marge stayed with him; he then finds a hospital appointment card dated two days later, confirming she was pregnant with Bart. When Homer confronts Marge about the letter, she says she was just upset that night but is forced to admit that Homer did, and still does, things that annoy her. Homer then realizes Marge has been resenting him behind his back. The next day, they argue again and Homer leaves the house. He spends some time at Kirk Van Houten's apartment, but the generally depressive mood of the apartment complex where he lives drives him out. Homer then reads a newspaper saying that there is a place available. Finding out that the place is in Springfield's gay district, Homer moves in with a gay male couple, Grady and Julio. Homer has a visit home after taking Bart and Lisa out, but Marge and Homer still argue. At a gay bar, Homer tells Grady and Julio that his relationship with Marge is on the rocks.

The next day, Homer sees Marge and the kids, who have brought "Weird Al" Yankovic and his band, who play a song called "Homer and Marge", a parody of John Mellencamp's "Jack & Diane", to tell Homer that Marge loves him. Marge then asks Homer out on a date, but he is nervous while preparing for his date and drinks too much margarita. Meanwhile, at the venue of the date, Marge anxiously awaits Homer's arrival. When he arrives, she is upset that he is late and drunk, and leaves him. Back at the apartment, Grady tries to comfort Homer by telling him that he will find someone else, and kisses him romantically. Homer realizes that Grady is in love with him and jumps out of the window, heading to Moe's Tavern to get some advice from Moe. Homer is about to come to the realization that all of his problems are caused by alcohol when Moe forces beer down Homer's throat, giving him alcohol poisoning.

After Homer awakens, Dr. Hibbert tells him that the incident was not as bad as the night he first treated him for alcohol poisoning. Homer says it was the night that destroyed his marriage. Hibbert disagrees and plays a tape from the past of Homer's first alcohol poisoning. Marge says that she loves him in the tape. Marge appears and says she still does, and they reconcile.

Years later, an elderly Dr. Hibbert is watching the tape and remarks that he made tapes because he suspected a nurse of stealing sponges. Then, for the first time, he sees footage of the nurse sneaking past the hidden security-camera while gathering a huge armful of sponges.

Production

Harvey Fierstein was asked to reprise his role as Karl from the season two episode "Simpson and Delilah" in a cameo appearance. In the script, Homer was thrown out of the house by Marge, and encountered Karl. The purpose of the appearance was to introduce a gay couple that Homer would live with. Fierstein however felt that "the script was a lot of very clever gay jokes, and there just wasn't that Simpsons twist" and turned the role down.

The jigsaw puzzle that the family builds is titled "Concert in Golden Gate Park". Writer Michael Price pitched a joke where Homer drools "mmm, Ferlinghetti..." in reference to Lawrence Ferlinghetti, Poet Laureate of San Francisco.

Reception

The episode won the Emmy Award in 2003 for Outstanding Animated Program (Programming Less Than One Hour.) In his review of the Kiss and Tell DVD, Andy Dougan of the Evening Times'' characterized the episode as one of the "funniest episodes of recent series".

References

External links

The Simpsons (season 14) episodes
2003 American television episodes
American LGBT-related television episodes
LGBT-related animated television episodes
Television episodes about alcohol abuse
Emmy Award-winning episodes